Duncan John Sloss, CBE (19 June 1881 – 29 July 1964) was a British scholar. He was the vice-chancellor of the University of Hong Kong from 1937 to 1949.

Sloss spent his earlier years in British colony India, working in the Indian Education Service from 1920. He became the principal of the University College, Rangoon. For his contributions he was awarded Commander of the Order of the British Empire in 1925 Birthday Honours. He went on become vice-chancellor of the University of Hong Kong.

He was held in the Stanley Internment Camp during the Japanese occupation of Hong Kong. After the surrender of Japan in August 1945, he was appointed publicity officer by Franklin Charles Gimson to hold daily press conferences to explain British policies to the population. To clear the alleged favouritism being shown by the authorities to the ex-internees, he informed the readers that the administration was "working ceaselessly to ensure the well-being of the people of all races".

He took a leading role in the decision to rebuild the University of Hong Kong after the war. The Duncan Sloss School of Engineering and Architecture opened in 1950 was named after Sloss.

Sloss died in Oxford on 29 July 1964.

See also
 List of Vice-Chancellors of the University of Hong Kong

References

1881 births
1964 deaths
Hong Kong in World War II
Members of the Executive Council of Hong Kong
Vice-Chancellors of the University of Hong Kong
British people in colonial India
British people in British Hong Kong